Hell's House is a 1932 American Pre-Code drama film starring Junior Durkin, featuring Bette Davis and directed by Howard Higgin. The screenplay by Paul Gangelin and B. Harrison Orkow, set during the waning days of the Prohibition era, is based on a story by Higgin.

Plot
When orphaned Jimmy Mason is taken in by his Aunt Emma and Uncle Henry, he meets their boarder, Matt Kelly, who impresses the young man with his boastful swagger and alleged political connections, although in reality he's a bootlegger.

The boy's life is disrupted when, as one of Kelly's hired hands, he refuses to identify his boss during a police raid and is sentenced to three years of hard labor in reform school, where he befriends a sickly boy named Shorty, who in helping Jimmy, eventually is sent to solitary confinement.

When Jimmy realizes his new pal is seriously ill and desperately needs medical attention, he escapes and goes to Kelly and Kelly's girl friend, Peggy Gardner, for help. Peggy contacts newspaper columnist Frank Gebhardt, who is anxious to expose the conditions at the state industrial school.

The authorities find Jimmy at Gebhardt's office, but before they can apprehend him Kelly admits his involvement in the bootlegging operation and the boy is set free. He discovers Shorty has died, victimized by a corrupt system.

Cast (in credits order)
 Bette Davis as Peggy Gardner
 Pat O'Brien as Matt Kelly
 Junior Durkin as Jimmy Mason
 Frank Coghlan Jr. as Shorty
 Emma Dunn as Emma Clark
 Charley Grapewin as Henry Clark
 Morgan Wallace as Frank Gebhardt
 Hooper Atchley as Captain Of The Guard
 Wallis Clark as Judge Robinson
 James A. Marcus as Superintendent Charles Thompson

Production
The film, shot in thirteen days, originally was entitled Juvenile Court. Bette Davis was loaned to B. F. Zeidman Productions Ltd. by Universal Pictures, and following her completion of this film studio head Carl Laemmle, Jr. allowed her option to drop. She was preparing to return to New York City when George Arliss offered her the ingenue role in The Man Who Played God.

Critical reception
In his review in The New York Times, Mordaunt Hall observed, "The attempt to pillory reform schools . . . is hardly adult in its attack, but it has a few moderately interesting interludes . . . The direction of this film is old-fashioned. Pat O'Brien . . . gives a forced performance. Young Durkin's playing is sincere and likewise that of Bette Davis as Peggy."

References

External links

 
 
 
 
 

1932 films
1932 crime drama films
1930s prison films
American black-and-white films
American crime drama films
Films about prohibition in the United States
Films directed by Howard Higgin
American prison films
Films produced by B. F. Zeidman
1930s English-language films
1930s American films